Tianeti is a municipality of Georgia, in the region of Mtskheta-Mtianeti. Its main town is Tianeti.

Population: 9,468 (2014 census)

Area: 906 km2

Politics

Tianeti Municipal Assembly (Georgian: თიანეთის საკრებულო) is a representative body in Tianeti Municipality. currently consisting of 27 members. The council is assembles into session regularly, to consider subject matters such as code changes, utilities, taxes, city budget, oversight of city government and more. Tianeti sakrebulo is elected every four year. The last election was held in October 2021.

See also 
 List of municipalities in Georgia (country)

References

External links 
 Districts of Georgia, Statoids.com

Municipalities of Mtskheta-Mtianeti